= Mbed drill =

Mbed drill, or more fully the Mercury Barometer Exploration Drill, was constructed as an experiment by an undergraduate student at the University of Tennessee. The drill was made to be able to detect vacuums and changes in air pressure during the drilling process. This form of detection is able to detect explosions, tremors, and sponge quakes, before reaching the drilling platform. As of 2014 this drill is patent pending.
